Patrik Ternován (born 10 June 1997) is a Hungarian professional footballer who plays for Soroksár.

Club statistics

Updated to games played as of 25 August 2019.

References

1997 births
Living people
People from Miskolc
Hungarian footballers
Association football midfielders
Diósgyőri VTK players
Balmazújvárosi FC players
Tiszakécske FC footballers
Soroksár SC players
Nemzeti Bajnokság I players
Nemzeti Bajnokság II players
Nemzeti Bajnokság III players
21st-century Hungarian people